The fastball is the most common type of pitch thrown by pitchers in baseball and softball. Pitchers who throw more slowly can put movement on the ball, or throw it on the outside of home plate where batters can't easily reach it.

Fastballs are usually thrown with backspin, so that the Magnus effect creates an upward force on the ball. This causes it to fall less rapidly than expected, and sometimes causes an optical illusion often called a rising fastball.  Although it is impossible for a human to throw a baseball fast enough and with enough backspin for the ball to actually rise, to the batter the pitch seems to rise due to the unexpected lack of natural drop on the pitch.

A straight pitch is achieved by gripping the ball with the fingers across the wide part of the seam (called a "four-seam fastball") so that both the index and middle fingers are  touching two seams perpendicularly. A sinking fastball is thrown by gripping it across the narrow part (a "two-seam fastball") so that both the index  and middle fingers are along a seam. Lateral motion is achieved by holding a four-seam fastball off-center (a "cut fastball"), and sinking action with a lateral break is thrown by splitting the fingers along the seams (a "split-finger fastball").

Colloquially, a fastball pitcher "throws heat" or "puts cream on it", among many other variants.

Pitches

Four-seam fastball

The four-seam fastball is the most common variant of the fastball. The pitch is used often by the pitcher to get ahead in the count or when he needs to throw a strike. This type of fastball is intended to have minimal lateral movement, relying more on its velocity. It is often perceived as the fastest pitch a pitcher throws, with recorded top speeds above 100 mph.  The fastest pitch recognized by Major League Baseball (MLB) was on September 25, 2010, at Petco Park in San Diego by then-Cincinnati Reds left-handed relief pitcher Aroldis Chapman. It was clocked at 105.1 miles per hour.

April 19, 2011 Chapman lit up the stadium radar gun at 106 MPH (the TV-reading had his pitch at 105 MPH, and the pitchF/X reading was actually 102.4 MPH).

Two general methods are used to throw a four-seam fastball. The first and most traditional way is to find the horseshoe seam area, or the area where the seams are the farthest apart. Keeping those seams parallel to the body, the pitcher places his index and middle fingers perpendicular to them with the pads on the farthest seam from him. The thumb then rests underneath the ball about in the middle of the two fingers. With this grip, the thumb will generally have no seam on which to rest.

The four seam fastball is widely regarded as the main key to advancing to the next level of play. One of a baseball scout's main criteria when scouting a prospect is how fast he throws a four seam fastball. The game of baseball keeps on progressing, and as research on the physics of throwing is published and recognized, fastball velocity training has become more effective. This can be shown by looking at the average fastball velocity in the major leagues as time progresses. In 2008 the average fastball thrown in the MLB was 90.9 mph. 5 years later it had risen to 92.0. To show the effect that this increase in velocity has had on hitters in the big leagues, we can look at the runs scored stat. In 2008, the average number of runs a team scored a game was 4.6; 5 years later as the velocity increased, the average dropped by half a run a game, to 4.0.

The pitch velocity has gone up so much mostly by the development of better training and clearer communication within the baseball community that velocity is so valued. People like Tom House, Eric Cressey, Kyle Boddy, and Ron Wolforth have all pushed the edge and dedicated careers to research on what makes the ultimate pitcher. Pitchers are getting bigger, faster and stronger, and pushing their bodies in the weight room as well as with weighted ball throwing. All of this has created a faster, more powerful game for pitchers on the mound today.

Higher pitch velocities have resulted in fewer hits and other imbalances. A more distant pitcher's mound and other changes have been proposed to restore balance.

Two-seam fastball

A two-seam fastball, sometimes called a two-seamer, tailing fastball, running fastball, or sinker is another variant of the straight fastball. It is designed to have more movement than a four-seam fastball, so the batter cannot hit it hard, but it can be more difficult to master and control.  Because of the deviation from the straight trajectory, the two-seam fastball is sometimes called a moving fastball.

The pitcher grabs a baseball and finds the area on it where the seams are the closest together, and puts his index and middle fingers on each of those seams. A sinker is a similar pitch that drops 3 to 6 inches more than a typical two-seam fastball; this causes batters to hit ground balls more often, mostly due to the tilted sidespin on the ball.

Each finger should be touching the seam from the pads or tips to almost the ball of each finger. The thumb should rest underneath the ball in the middle of those two fingers, finding the apex of the horseshoe part of the seam. The thumb needs to rest on that seam from the side to the middle of its pad. If the middle finger is used, more whipping action occurs, making the pitch go around 10 mph faster.  This ball tends to move for the pitcher a little bit depending on velocity, arm slot angle, and pressure points of the fingers. Retired pitchers Greg Maddux and Pedro Martínez were known for their effective two-seamers.

Depending on the grip and pressure applied with the fingers, sometimes the two-seam fastball features more sink than lateral movement. Sinkerballers tend to induce a lot of ground ball outs because hitters tend to swing over the ball due to the late downward movement, thus often end up beating the ball into the ground. Roberto Hernández of the Philadelphia Phillies, Justin Masterson of the St. Louis Cardinals, Derek Lowe of the New York Yankees, Tim Hudson of the San Francisco Giants, Aaron Cook of the Colorado Rockies, Clay Buchholz of the Boston Red Sox, Roy Halladay of the Philadelphia Phillies, Chris Volstad of the Chicago White Sox, Trevor Cahill of the Chicago Cubs, and Bronson Arroyo of the Arizona Diamondbacks are or were well known for their sinkers, consistently ranking high in the league in ground ball-to-fly ball ratio.

Rising fastball

The rising fastball is an effect perceived by some batters, but is a baseball myth. Some batters  are under the impression that they have seen a "rising" fastball, which starts with the trajectory of  a normal fastball, but which as it approaches the plate rises several inches and gains a burst of speed. Tom Seaver, Jim Palmer, Sandy Koufax, Dwight Gooden, Nolan Ryan and Chan Ho Park have been described as paramount pitchers with this kind of ball action.

Such a pitch is known to be beyond the physical capabilities of pitchers, due to the very high backspin required to overcome gravity with the Magnus effect.  While not physically impossible (conservation of momentum is maintained through imparting the required opposing momentum to air, as an airplane does at takeoff), the amount of spin required is beyond the capabilities of a human arm.  It has been explained as an optical illusion.

What is likely happening is that the pitcher first throws a fastball at one speed, and then, using an identical arm motion, throws another fastball at a higher speed.  The higher-speed fastball arrives faster and sinks less due to its high speed. The added back-spin from the higher speed further decreases the amount of sink.  When the pitch is thrown, the batter expects a fastball at the same speed, yet it arrives more quickly and at a higher level.  The batter perceives it as a fastball which has risen and increased in speed.  A switch from a two-seam to a fastball can enhance this effect.

This perception may also be created by a tall, hard-throwing pitcher who throws the ball from a higher release point on an elevated mound (the pitcher's rubber is 10 inches above the field level). Factoring in the element of depth perception when the hitter watches the pitcher from 60 ft 6 in away from the pitcher's mound, and the hitter perceives the pitcher's size and positioning on the mound to be less elevated than it actually is. Hence, to the hitter, an overhand pitch will appear to be thrown at a hitter's shoulder level (or even belt level), as opposed to several inches above the hitter's head, from where the pitch is actually released from the pitcher's hand. This perception enhances the apparent "rising" motion of the fastball when the pitch passes the hitter at a higher level than where the hitter perceived the pitch to have left the pitcher's hand.

It is possible for a rising fastball to be thrown by a submarine pitcher because of the technique with which they throw the ball. Because they throw almost underhanded with their knuckles near the field surface, the batter perceives the sensation of the ball going upward because of its low starting point and flight trajectory. This is not the traditional rising fastball batters believe they see.  This type of movement is similar to a rising fastball in fast-pitch softball. Left-hander Sid Fernandez was known for throwing a rising fastball from a slightly "submarine" motion.

Cutter

A cut fastball, or "cutter", is similar to a slider, but the pitcher tends to use a four-seam grip. The pitcher shifts the grip on a four-seamer (often by slightly rotating the thumb inwards and the two top fingers to the outside) to create more spin. This usually causes the pitch to shift inwards or outwards by a few inches, less than a typical slider, and often late. A cutter is effective for pitchers with a strong four-seamer since the grip and delivery look virtually identical. The unexpected motion will often fool batters into hitting the ball off-center, or missing it altogether.

Mariano Rivera, a now retired reliever for the New York Yankees, was known for throwing a cutter. In his prime, Rivera could deliver late motion while throwing the ball around 96 mph. Al Leiter rode his cutter to 162 career wins and a no-hitter. Roy Halladay threw a cut fastball, but claimed that overusing it had given him forearm trouble. This may have prematurely ended Halladay's 2006 season due to forearm stiffness, since the grip causes more stress than a standard four-seamer. Yankee Andy Pettitte is another pitcher who throws the cutter. On a June 3, 2007, game against the  Red Sox, announcer Joe Morgan estimated that of Pettitte's 87 pitches, 83 of them were cutters. Jamie Moyer used a cutter that became an important pitch due to his relatively low velocity late in his career.  Many other major league pitchers have added the cut fastball, as well.

Split-finger fastball

The split-finger fastball, or "splitter", is truly an off-speed pitch rather than a type of fastball.  Like the changeup, to which it is a close relative, it is thrown with the same arm motion as a normal fastball, but the adjusted grip causes it to behave quite differently. The ball does not have the characteristically tight spin of a fastball. The ball appears to tumble in a knuckleball-like fashion; but it is much faster than a knuckleball. The ball is gripped tightly with the index and middle fingers "split" along the outside of the horseshoe seam. It is important that at least one finger is touching the seam, as the ability to control the release of the ball is derived from this contact. The release is the same as a fastball. A splitter usually drops as it approaches the plate, and breaks to either the right or left. The forkball is a similar pitch, though it is slower and gripped with a more exaggerated split of the fingers. A pitcher generally needs long, flexible fingers to effectively throw this pitch.  Due to similarities in speed and movement, some pitchers' split-finger fastballs are misidentified as changeups.

It helps to have larger hands to throw this pitch.  Because the fingers are spread wider than normal on the baseball, this pitch produces more stress from the hand up through the arm.  While the mechanics are the same as a normal fastball, the stress it places on the hand and arm is different.  Over time it is possible to damage the arm.  It is therefore not recommended for younger pitchers to learn this pitch.  Older pitchers should feel comfortable deploying this pitch, but to use it in moderation. The splitter is an effective pitch because the hitter generally picks up the movement later and either swings over the ball or produces a weakly hit ground ball.

The split-finger is used currently by pitchers such as Jonathan Papelbon, and Masahiro Tanaka.  Former players noted for use of the split-finger fastball include Bruce Sutter, Mike Scott, John Smoltz, Jack Morris, Kazuhiro Sasaki, Bryan Harvey, Roger Clemens, Dan Haren,  and Fred Breining.

Incurve
The incurve was a term used until about 1930 used to describe a simple fastball. As a curveball was often called an "outcurve", one might assume that an incurve is the opposite of a curveball, in other words, the modern screwball. However, this does not appear to be so, as cited by John McGraw.
All balls that are twisted out of their natural course are called curves. The curveball, the drop, down shoot, and so on, are simply a curve ball to the professional player. To us there is no such thing as an incurve. That is what we call a fastball. Of course, I am assuming the pitcher is right-handed. A so-called incurve is nothing more than a ball thrown in a natural way with great force. A ball thus thrown will naturally curve inward, to a certain extent.

Side-arm fastball
A side-arm fastball is thrown from an angle different from the normal one. It is at a lower angle and is thrown from the side, hence the name "side"-arm. It will have a sinking motion to the right if the pitcher is right-handed, or to the left if the pitcher is left-handed. It is usually slower than a normal four-seam fastball.

References

Baseball pitches
Baseball plays